Best Selection is the title of two compilation albums released by Aimer on May 3, 2017. Each album was released in three versions: a regular CD edition, a limited CD + Blu-ray edition (Type-A), and a limited CD + DVD edition (Type-B).

Best Selection "blanc"

Best Selection "blanc" is a compilation of Aimer's soft ballads such as "Kataomoi", "Rokutosei no Yoru", and "Chouchou Musubi", and includes the new songs "March of Time" and "Kachou Fugetsu". The album peaked at #3 on Oricon's Weekly Album Chart on May 15, 2017 and charted for 87 weeks.

Track listing

Charts

Sales and certifications

Best Selection "noir"

In contrast to the "blanc" album, Best Selection "noir" compiles Aimer's heavier, rock-oriented tracks such as "RE:I AM", "Brave Shine", and "StarRingChild", and includes the new song "zero". The album peaked at #4 on Oricon's Weekly Album Chart on May 15, 2017 and charted for 66 weeks.

Track listing

Charts

Sales and certifications

References

External links
 Best Selection "blanc" Aimer on Aimer-Web
 Best Selection "blanc" Aimer on agehasprings
 
 
 Best Selection "blanc" / Aimer  on VGMdb
 Best Selection "noir" Aimer on Aimer-Web
 Best Selection "noir" Aimer on agehasprings
 
 Best Selection "noir" / Aimer  on VGMdb

Aimer albums
2017 albums
Japanese-language compilation albums
SME Records albums